This is a list of famous people who have lived in Taganrog. Please add new people and also add the dates they lived in Taganrog, if known.

Actors, Performers, Cinema 
   Sergei Bondarchuk, actor and film director, Oscar (Academy Award for Best Foreign Language Film) of 1968, graduated from the Taganrog School Num. 4 in 1938
 Pavel Derevyanko, actor, born in Taganrog in 1976
 Fyodor Dobronravov, actor, born in Taganrog in 1961
 Viktor Dobronravov, actor, born in Taganrog in 1983
 Nikolai Dobrynin, actor, born in Taganrog in 1963
 Anatoly Anatolievich Durov, circus animal trainer, 1926–1928
 Vatslav Dvorzhetsky, Soviet actor, Peoples' Artist of Russia, worked at Taganrog Theatre in 1940–1941
 Victor Dyomin, Soviet cinema critic, editor, writer, actor, born in Taganrog in 1937, graduate of Chekhov Gymnasium (1954)
  Vatslav Mikhalsky, Soviet and Russian writer, screenwriter and editor, born in Taganrog in 1938
  Elena Obraztsova, mezzo-soprano, studied in 1954–1957
 Ivan Perestiani, Soviet actor and film director, one of the founding fathers of Georgian cinematography, born in Taganrog in 1870
   Faina Ranevskaya, actress, Stalin Prize laureate (twice), People's Artist of USSR, born in Taganrog in 1896
 Tofik Shakhverdiev, Soviet and Russian film director and screenwriter, 1940s-1960.
    Petr Shelokhonov, Russian actor of film and theatre, Honorable Actor of Russia, worked at Taganrog Theatre in 1962–1968
 Marianna Tavrog, Soviet Russian documentary film director, born in Taganrog in 1921.
 Vladislav Vetrov, Soviet and Russian actor of film and theatre,   Honorable Actor of Russia, 1979 – late 1980s
  Alexander Leonidovich Vishnevsky, actor, one of the founders of Moscow Art Theatre, and friend of Anton Chekhov. Like Chekhov, Vishnevsky was born and studied in Taganrog
 Zinoviy Vysokovskiy, People's Artist of Russia, born and lived in Taganrog in 1932–1956

Art & architecture
 Alexey Adamov, artist, born in Taganrog in 1971
 Taisia Afonina, Soviet Russian artist, studied in 1928-1931
 Klavdiya Balanova, Soviet artist, born in Taganrog in 1915. 
 Seraphima Blonskaya, artist, 1875–1947
 Nikolay Chekhov, artist, brother of Anton Chekhov, born in Taganrog in 1858
 Maria Chekhova, artist, sister of Anton Chekhov, born in Taganrog in 1863
 Natalia Duritskaya, artist, born in Taganrog in 1960
 Arkhip Kuindzhi, artist, 1860–1865
 Victor Malinka, artist, illustrator of books for children, born in Taganrog in 1935
 Ivan Martos, studied in the Taganrog Boys Gymnasium
 Yakov Rubanchik, Soviet Russian architect, born in Taganrog in 1899.
 Konstantin Savitsky, artist, born in Taganrog in 1844
 Fyodor Schechtel, architect, three buildings in Taganrog, including the Chekhov Library
 Dmitri Sinodi-Popov, artist, born in Taganrog in 1855 and spent most of his life here
 Andrei Shtakenschneider, architect of the Alferaki Palace
 Nadezhda Shvets, artist, born in Taganrog in 1959
 Oleg Skarainis, Soviet Latvian sculptor, born in Taganrog in 1923. 
 François Sainte de Wollant, architect, engineer-general, in charge for construction of the Taganrog seaport in 1804
 William Frederick Yeames, British painter, born in Taganrog in 1835
 Leonid Yegorov, Russian artist and sculptor, born and died in Taganrog 1848–1890

Authors
 Nikolay Yakovlevich Abramovich, Russian writer, historian of Russian literature, poet, born in Taganrog in 1881
 Vladimir Yakovlevich Abramovich, Russian poet, writer and journalist, born in Taganrog in 1877
 Nonna Bannister, Soviet-born American author, born in Taganrog in 1927
 Vladimir Tan-Bogoraz, Russian anthropologist and writer, born and lived in Taganrog until 1886
 Alexander Chekhov, Russian novelist, short story writer, essayist and memoirist, the elder brother of Anton Chekhov, father of Michael Chekhov
 Anton Chekhov, playwright and short-story writer, born in Taganrog in 1860
 Yevgeny Garshin, novelist and publisher, 1900–1911
 Dmitri Girs, writer, born in Taganrog in 1836
 Igor Grigoriev, journalist, producer, musician, performer, film director, born in Taganrog in 1966
 Oleg Haslavsky, Russian poet and translator.
 Boris Izyumskiy, Soviet writer, studied in Taganrog
 Andrey Korsakov, Soviet Russian and Ukrainian linguist and language philosopher. Born in Taganrog in 1916.
 Alexander Korsun, writer, studied and worked in Taganrog, 1826–1837, 
 Nestor Kukolnik, playwright, poet and politician, 1857–1868
 Alexander Lakier, historian and founder of Russian heraldry, born and died in Taganrog
 Vitali Melentiev, Soviet Russian writer, 1918– mid-1930s
  Vatslav Mikhalsky, Soviet and Russian writer, screenwriter and editor, born in Taganrog in 1938
 Osip Notovich, writer, born and studied in Taganrog 
 Valentin Ovechkin, writer, studied in 1913–1919, 1925–1931 and 1950s
 Valentin Parnakh, Poet, translator, choreographer. Founder of the Russian Jazz music. Born in Taganrog in 1891
 Sophia Yakovlevna Parnok, poet and translator, born in Taganrog in 1885
 Konstantin Paustovsky, writer, 1916
 Isaac Yakovlevich Pavlovsky, journalist and writer, born in Taganrog in 1853
 Iosif Prut, playwright, born in Taganrog in 1900
 Alexander Pushkin, poet, stayed in June 1820
 Solomon Rubin, Neo-Hebrew author, 1873–1878
 Nikolay Fedorovich Sherbina, poet, 1820s–1850
 Konstantin Staniukovich, writer 1870–1871
 Mikhail Tanich – poet and songwriter, born in Taganrog in 1923
 Yelizaveta Tarakhovskaya, writer, poet, translator, born in Taganrog in 1891
  Ivan Vasilenko, writer, 1901–1966
 Maximilian Voloshin, Russian poet, early childhood years (1778-1882)
 Sergey Zvantsev, writer. Born in Taganrog in 1893.
 Eugeniusz Żytomirski, Polish poet, playwright, novelist. Born in Taganrog in 1911

Russian Czars 

 Peter I (Peter the Great) founder of Taganrog in 1698
 Alexander I died in Taganrog in 1825
 Louise of Baden (Yelizaveta Alexeevna) 1825–1826

Governors and Governors-General of Taganrog

Military leaders, statesmen, war heroes, revolutionaries, politicians
 Anatoly Aistov, Soviet counter-admiral, born in Taganrog in 1917
 Viktor Anpilov, Russian politician and trade unionist, studied and worked in Taganrog in 1960-1964/
 Mikhail Baturin, Soviet intelligence officer, father to Yuri Baturin, born in Taganrog in 1904
 Boris Mikhailovich Belousov, USSR Minister of Engineering Industry in 1987–1989 and Soviet Minister of Defence Industry in 1989–1991, graduated from the Taganrog University (TSURE) in 1958.
  Cornelius Cruys, Russian Navy admiral of Norwegian descent, Commander of Taganrog's fortress in 1698–1702, 1711
 Anton Denikin, Lieutenant-General, held in Taganrog General Headquarters from August 8, 1919 to December 23, 1919
 Hermann von Eichhorn, German Generalfeldmarschall during World War I, spring 1918.
  Ivan Furugelm, (Swedish spelling Johan Hampus Furuhjelm) vice-admiral, explorer, President of Russian-American Company, Governor of Taganrog in 1874–1876, Governor of Russian America, 1859–1863
  Kuzma Galitsky Soviet Army general, born in Taganrog in 1897, Hero of the Soviet Union
 Giuseppe Garibaldi, Italian patriot and military leader of Risorgimento, several visits in 1832–1833
 Iosif Gershtein, commander of Azov Flotilla in 1918.
  Leonid Gobyato, Russian general, inventor of the first Russian mortar, born and lived in Taganrog until 1887
  Ivan Golubets, Hero of the Soviet Union, born in Taganrog in 1916, studied and worked in Taganrog until WWII
  Andrey Grechko, Marshal of USSR, Hero of the Soviet Union, military service in Taganrog in 1919–1926
 Victor Grushko, deputy Head of Soviet Committee of State Security in 1987–1991, born in Taganrog in 1930
 Konstantin Igelström, Decembrist, founded and headed the secret Society of Military Friends in 1818; settled in Taganrog in 1843, where he died in 1851
 Ivan Kadatsky-Rudnev Flag officer 1st rank, commander of Amur Military Flotilla. Born in Taganrog in 1889, graduated from Taganrog Naval School.
 Dimitrios Kallergis,  Greek soldier and statesman. Early 19th century (according to several sources born in Taganrog, or settled in Taganrog around 1806).
  Sir John Noble Kennedy, British major-general, Artillery Liaison Officer of the 1 Corps of the anti-Bolshevik White Russian Army, August 1919 – December 24, 1919
 Ivan Krasnov, Russian general responsible for defence of Taganrog during Siege of Taganrog in 1855
 Nikolay Krasnov, Russian lieutenant-general, hero of Crimean War, since the 1850s until 1900
  Lev Kultshitskiy, rear-admiral, Governor of Taganrog in 1868–1873
  Ivan Kupin, Soviet mayor-general, graduated from Chekhov Gymnasium, worked in Taganrog.
     Pavel Stepanovich Kutakhov, Commander of USSR air forces since 1964, Marshal of air forces in 1972, twice Hero of the Soviet Union, studied and worked in Taganrog in 1929–1935
 Alexander Kutepov, lieutenant-general of the Russian White Army, leader of the Russian All-Military Union in 1928-1930. Commander of Taganrog's garrison in December 1917-January 1918.  
  Mikhail Andrianovich Lavrov, admiral, polar explorer, Governor of Taganrog in 1857–1864
  Pavel Maksutov, rear-admiral, Governor of Taganrog in 1876–1882
  Mikhail Mesheryakov Soviet Army general, Hero of the Soviet Union, born in Taganrog in 1896
 Andrey Martynov, Russian general, studied in Taganrog's Boys' Gymnasium
  Vladimir Mikhaylov, former commander-in-chief of the Russian Air Force, served at Taganrog air force regiment in 1966–1975
 Maksim Mishenko, founder and leader of the youth movement Rumol (Young Russia), born in Taganrog in 1977
  Semion Morozov, commissar of Taganrog antifascist resistance in WWII, posthumously Hero of the Soviet Union, born (1914), lived and died (1943) in Taganrog
  Pavel Pereleshin, rear-admiral, Governor of Taganrog in 1865–1866
  Pavel Pustoshkin, vice-admiral, served in Taganrog, commander of shipbuilding yard and commander of the Taganrog seaport. 1769–1772, 1787-1790.
 Alexandre Remi, mayor-general, brother officer of Mikhail Lermontov, 1850s–1871
 Paul von Rennenkampf, general of Baltic German descent, 1917–1918
  Boris Rivkin, Soviet mayor-general of aviation, graduate of the Chekhov Gymnasium.
  Pyotr Schmidt, revolutionary, 1890–1893
  Georgy Sedov, Russian Arctic explorer, born in Taganrog's district in 1877
  Alexey Senyavin, admiral, commander of Taganrog's fortress in 1769–1774
  Yevgeny Shapovalov, mayor-general, born in Taganrog in 1904
 Aleksei Shein, Russian boyar, statesman, the first Russian Generalissimos, 1697–1698 
  Ivan Shestakov, admiral, Governor of Taganrog in 1866–1868
 Nadezhda Sigida, revolutionary, born (1862) and lived in Taganrog, executed in 1889 (Kara katorga) 
 Sokrates Starynkiewicz, general and governor of Warsaw, born in Taganrog in 1820
  Fyodor Ushakov, admiral, late 1770s
 Ioannis Varvakis, Greek patriot, benefactor and merchant, 1813–1825
  Ippolit Vogak, rear-admiral, Governor of Taganrog in 1885–1887
 Semion Voskov, Russian revolutionary, died in Taganrog in 1920
  Pavel Zelenoy, rear-admiral, Governor of Taganrog in 1882–1885

Music
 Achilles Alferaki, composer, 1846–1888
 Roman Bilyk (:ru:Билык, Роман Витальевич), leader of the Russian pop band Zveri, born in 1977
 David Blok (:ru:Блок, Давид Семёнович), Soviet composer, born in Taganrog in 1888
 Adolf Brodsky, violinist, born in Taganrog in 1851
 Juliana Donskaya, songwriter, born in Taganrog in 1974
 Nikolay Lebedev (:ru:Лебедев, Николай Николаевич), musician, producer, DJ, born in Taganrog in 1976
 Samuel Maykapar, composer, pianist and author of many pianoforte pieces for kids, 1867–1885
 Gaetano Molla, director of the Italian Opera in Taganrog, 1860s–1880s
 Valentin Parnakh, Poet, translator, choreographer. Founder of the Russian Jazz music. Born in Taganrog in 1891
 Witold Rowicki, Polish conductor, born in 1914
 Vyacheslav Suk, Russian violinist, conductor and composer, worked in 1887–1890, founder of the music classes at The Tchaikovsky Children's School of Music in Taganrog
 Peter Ilyich Tchaikovsky, composer, frequently stayed in his brother's house (Ippolit Tchaikovsky) in Taganrog
 Sovet Varelas, composer, born in Taganrog in 1923
 Anatoly Zagot, Soviet Russian folk singer, born in Taganrog in 1936
 Vladimir Grigorievich Zakharov, composer, Peoples' Artist of USSR, art director of Pyatnitsky Choir, student of the Chekhov Gymnasium, 1912–1921 
   Vasily Zolotarev, composer, born in Taganrog in 1872
 Dmitri Chkurin, leader of the Russian Industrial Metal band Illidiance, born in 1984
 Viktorija Loba (born 1988), Macedonian singer

Pilots and explorers
  Vitus Jonassen Bering, Russian-Danish navigator and explorer, 1711–1712
   Vladimir Dzhanibekov, space pilot, twice Hero of the Soviet Union, studied at Taganrog State University of Radioengineering and served military service in 1962–1970.
  Ivan Furugelm, (Finnish spelling Johan Hampus Furuhjelm) vice-admiral, explorer, President of Russian-American Company, Governor of Taganrog in 1874–1876, Governor of Russian America, 1859–1863
  Boris Galitsky (:ru:Галицкий, Борис Карпович), Soviet Russian test pilot, Hero of the Soviet Union, born in Taganrog in 1914
 Anatoly Gudzenko, Russian traveler, full member of Russian Geographical Society, born in Taganrog in 1868
  Mikhail Andrianovich Lavrov, admiral, polar explorer, Governor of Taganrog in 1857–1864
  Anatoly Lomakin (:ru:Ломакин, Анатолий Георгиевич), fighter-pilot, Hero of the Soviet Union, born in Taganrog in 1921
   Yury Malyshev, space pilot, twice Hero of the Soviet Union, studied in Taganrog in 1949–1959
  Viktor Pugachyov, Soviet Russian test pilot, Hero of the Soviet Union, inventor of the Pugachev's Cobra maneuver on Su-27, born in Taganrog in 1948
  Georgy Sedov, Russian Arctic explorer, born in Taganrog district in 1877

Religion
 Saint Pavel of Taganrog, around 1825/1830-1879

Science, Heroes of Socialist Labor, Business people 
 Sergei Alphéraky, Russian ornithologist and entomologist, in 1850-70s 
 Yevgeni Andreyev, Privy Councilor, founder of the Russian Technical Society, author of the law for the child labor (1882), born in Taganrog in 1829
  Alexey Astakhov, director of TAGMET, 1921–1984
 Sergey Dmitrievich Balukhatiy, bibliographer, academic, studied in Taganrog
 Robert Bartini, designer of amphibious aircraft, 1946–1952
 Nikolay Apollonovich Belelyubski, engineer, scientist, famous designer of bridges, graduated from Taganrog Boys Gymnasium in 1862
  Georgy Beriev, designer of amphibious aircraft, 1933-1970s
 Nikolay Bogoraz – Russian pioneer of phalloplasty and penile implant surgery, born and studied in Taganrog
  Leonid Gobyato, Russian general, inventor of the first Russian mortar, born and lived in Taganrog until 1887
 Aleksandr Viktorovich Fyodorov, professor, media educator, non-fiction writer, editor. Lives and works in Taganrog.
 Hanon Izakson, designer of the first Soviet self-propelled farm machines, 1953–1985
 Anatoly Kalyaev, scientist, founder of the research institute of multiprocessing computer systems etc., Hero of Socialist Labor, 1954–2004
 Alexandre Koyré, French philosopher, born in Taganrog in 1892
 Vladimir Alexandrovich Lebedev, Russian pilot, aircraft builder, recipient of Légion d'honneur, founder of Taganrog Airplane Factory, 1915–1916 
 Victor Litvinov, Soviet aircraft designer, responsible for mass production of military aircraft, Minister of the General Engineering Industry in 1965–1973, born in Taganrog in 1910.
 Mikhail Nagibin, honorary aircraft builder of the Soviet Union, born in Taganrog in 1930, worked in Taganrog until 1980.
 Alexey Nicolaychuk, developer of influential overclock tool MSI Afterburner (RivaTuner) 
  Vladimir Petlyakov, Soviet aircraft designer, born in a village near Taganrog, studied in Taganrog in 1899–1910
 Rosa Pavlovsky de Rosemberg, Russian-born (in Taganrog, 1862) Argentine physician (d. 1936)
 Boris Podolsky, physicist, born in Taganrog in 1896
 Yuriy Rumer, Soviet physicist, worked in Taganrog in 1946-1948
  Alexander Samarskiy, mathematician, studied in Taganrog in 1932–1936
   Georgy Sergeev, Soviet designer of artillery and rocket systems, Hero of Socialist Labor, born in Taganrog in 1911
 Lazar Shaulov, business person, lived in Taganrog in 1990s. 
 Maria Smith-Falkner, economist, born in Taganrog in 1878.
 Vladimir Tan-Bogoraz, Russian anthropologist and writer, born and lived in Taganrog until 1886
 Nicolai Stepanovitch Turczaninow, Russian botanist, 1845-1850s or 1860s
 Panayis Athanase Vagliano, Greek merchant and shipowner

Sports
 Aleksandr Balakhnin, football player, played for FC Taganrog in 1975–1976
 Vladimir Dvorkovich, international chess arbiter, chairman of the judge board of Russian Federation, father to Arcady Dvorkovich, born in Taganrog in 1937, graduate of the Chekhov Gymnasium.
 Aleksei Gerasimenko, Russian football player, born in Taganrog in 1970
 Barys Haravoy, Russian and Belorussian football player, played for FC Taganrog in 1991–1995
 Aleksandr Karatayev, Russian football coach and player, born in Taganrog in 1973
 Nikolai Krivun, chess player, Correspondence chess champion of Russia (1972–1973), correspondence chess champion of Europe (1978–83, 1983–88).
 Igor Kudelin, Russian basketball player, silver medalist at 1998 FIBA World Championship
  Oleg Perepetchenov, heavy athlete, bronze medal at the Olympic Games (2004) (category Men's 77 Kilograms), silver medal in the Weightlifting World Championship in 2002, graduate of David Rigert's weightlifting school in Taganrog
 Eduard Posylayev, former Russian professional footballer
  David Rigert, heavy athletics World Champions (6 times), Olympic Champion (1976 Summer Olympics), European Champion (9 times), Soviet Union Champion (7 times), 63 world records and 69 USSR records, in Taganrog since the 1990s and alderman at Taganrog City Council since 2004
 Igor Saprykin, Finswimming World Champion in 2004, several European Champion and Russia Champion titles, born in Taganrog in 1980
  Aleksandr Savin, Soviet Russian volleyball player, Olympic Champion (silver at 1976 Summer Olympics and gold at 1980 Summer Olympics), born in Taganrog in 1957
 Aleksei Sereda, Russian football player, coach, director of FC Taganrog, born in Taganrog in 1966
 Dmitriy Shevchenko,  discus thrower, silver medalist at World and European Championships, born in Taganrog in 1968
  Igor Sklyarov, former Russian footballer, gold medal as member of the Soviet football team at 1988 Summer Olympics
 Nadezhda Slavinskaya-Belonenko (born Nadezhda Belonenko), tennis player, four-time USSR champion, in the national top ten tennis players in 1943–1955
 Sergey Superata, canoeist, gold medalist at World and European Championships, Soviet Union Champion, in Taganrog – 1976–1986
  Sergey Syrtsov, heavy athlete, 10 world records, silver medalist at 1992 Summer Olympics and 1996 Summer Olympics, World Champion (2 times), European Champion in 1995, Champion of Russia in 1997, has lived in Taganrog since 1994
 Anatoly Tishchenko, canoeist, gold medalist at European Championship in 1969, gold at World C. in 1970, Soviet Union Champion (9 times), born in 1943 and has lived in Taganrog
  Anatoli Tishchenko (junior), 7-time World Champ (1991–1999), Champion of Russia in 1990– 2004. canoeist, bronze medalist at 1996 Summer Olympics, born in Taganrog
 Olga Tishchenko, Russian sprint canoer, silver medalist at 1999 ICF Canoe Sprint World Championships in Milan, works in Taganrog
 Anatoli Vanzhula, Russian former professional footballer
 Victoria Voronina, Russian gymnast, gold medalist at 2010 Trampoline World Championships, born in Taganrog
  Arkady Vyatchanin, swimmer, champion of Europe in 2006 (100-meter backstroke), bronze medalist at 2008 Summer Olympics has lived and trained in Taganrog since 1999.
 Arkady Fyodorovich Vyatchanin, swimmer, nine-time champion of RSFSR, coach of the Soviet Union swimming team in 1965–1971, has lived and worked in Taganrog since 1999
 Yuliya Yefimova, swimmer, World Champion, European Champion, has lived and trained in Taganrog
 Viktor Zhylin, Ukrainian football defender and forward and manager, the master of sports, the honored trainer of Ukraine, born in Taganrog in 1923.

See also 

 List of Russian people
 List of Russian-language poets

Taganrog